This is a list of the men's national rugby league teams in the world. A full member test playing nation is a nation that has full membership of the Rugby League International Federation.

National Teams

Europe

Middle East

Asia

Oceania

Africa

North America

South America

RLIF Ranking

Debuts
Note: The rankings are of December, 2017. The list is also incomplete.

All were granted full-membership into the top tier. Great Britain haven't played together since then with the exception of the 2019 Great Britain Lions tour.
** Currently unranked by RLIF but is a known national rugby league team.
*** As Independent Nation.

See also

List of women's national rugby league teams

References

External links
Rugbyleagueplanet

Rugby league-related lists
Lists of rugby league clubs